David I (1569 – 21 October 1602), of the Bagrationi dynasty, was a king of Kakheti in eastern Georgia from October 1601 until his death in October 1602.

Life
David was a son of Alexander II of Kakheti by his wife Tinatin Amilakhvari. In mid-1601, he capitalized on the illness of his father and gained an effective control of the government, sidelining his younger brother George. When Alexander recovered, David refused to relinquish his powers and forced his father into abdication in October 1601. David was crowned king of Kakheti, but his brother, George, masterminded a plot which quickly collapsed and led to repressions. David had George imprisoned while seventeen of his supporters were executed.

David’s foreign policy was a continuation of his father’s line. In 1602, he received a Russian embassy and reaffirmed his loyalty to the tsar. He then marched against Nugzar, the defiant lord of the Aragvi and forced him into submission.

David suddenly died on 21 October 1602, and Alexander II recovered the crown. David is also remembered as a translator of a portion of the Tales of Kalila and Dimna from Persian.

Family
David married, c. 1581, Ketevan, daughter of Ashotan I, Prince of Mukhrani.

They were the parents of:
Teimuraz I of Kakheti, King of Kakheti
Prince Vakhtang (died 1604)
Princess Helene, given in marriage to Abbas I of Persia.
Princess Marta, married Abbas I of Persia

Ancestry

References

1569 births
1602 deaths
Bagrationi dynasty of the Kingdom of Kakheti
Kings of Kakheti
Translators from Persian